Delilah is an American television drama series, created by Craig Wright, and executive produced by Oprah Winfrey's Harpo Films and Warner Bros. Television. The series premiered on OWN on March 9, 2021 ran for eight episodes until April 27, and was canceled in early 2022.

Premise
The series follows Delilah Connolly (played by Maahra Hill), who left a white-shoe law firm a decade ago and hung up her own shingle so she could make raising her kids her number one priority, and now began taking cases the big firms ignore, going head-to-head with the powerful and privileged as she fights for the disenfranchised.

Cast and characters

Main
Maahra Hill as Delilah Connolly, a headstrong, highly principled lawyer in Charlotte, North Carolina
Jill Marie Jones as Tamara Roberts, Delilah's confidante and best friend
Susan Heyward as Demetria Barnes, Delilah's newly hired, fearless, and ambitious associate
Ozioma Akagha as Harper Obioha, Delilah's secretary
Kelly Jacobs as Maia Leighton, Delilah's teenage daughter
Braelyn Rankins as Marcus Leighton, Delilah's son
Khalil Johnson as Dion Connolly, Delilah's nephew

Recurring
LaMonica Garrett as Casey, Tamara's love interest who is Deputy Mayor of Charlotte
Lyriq Bent as Gordon Leighton, Delilah's ex-husband
Joseph Callender as Andre
Michel Curiel as Jamal, Casey's single best friend
 Nigel Gibbs as Wes Connolly, Delilah's father and Chief of Police of Charlotte. He has an estranged relationship with his children that he is hoping to repair.
Leonard Harmon as Nate Connolly, Delilah's warm-hearted younger brother and Army veteran who has been living in the Veteran Affairs Rehab Center after an injury abroad left him paralyzed and using a wheelchair
Candace B. Harris as Christine Connolly, Nate's estranged wife and Dion's mother
 Gray Hawks as Win, Tamara's boss
Joe Holt as Mace Cunningham, a private investigator, and one of Delilah's good friends
 Saycon Sengbloh as Leah Davis, Delilah's friend from college
 Amanda Tavarez as Katya, Gordon's girlfriend

Episodes

Production

Development
On August 26, 2020, it was announced that OWN had given Delilah a series order and would be produced by the same creative team behind Greenleaf''' of Craig Wright, Warner Bros. Television and Oprah Winfrey’s Harpo Films. Charles Randolph-Wright, Craig Wright and Oprah Winfrey will serve as the shows executive producers. Directors for the series include Randolph-Wright, Ayoka Chenzira, Crystle C. Roberson and Cheryl Dunye who will direct the pilot episode.

The series was canceled after one season in early 2022, however it wasn't made public until series star Maahra Hill was cast in the NBC pilot The Irrational'' in May.

Casting
On August 26, 2020, Maahra Hill was cast in a title role while Jill Marie Jones, Susan Heyward and Ozioma Akagha were cast as regulars. In January 2021, OWN announced that 14 actors including LaMonica Garrett and Lyriq Bent had joined the series in recurring and regular roles.

Release
On February 3, 2021 OWN released the first trailer for the series.

References

External links
 
 

2021 American television series debuts
2021 American television series endings
2020s American drama television series
English-language television shows
Oprah Winfrey Network original programming
Television series by Warner Bros. Television Studios
Television shows set in North Carolina